St Albans Museums is a collection of museums and historic buildings in the city of St Albans, Hertfordshire, England that is run by St Albans City and District Council. It oversees St Albans Museum + Gallery and the Verulamium Museum, and also the Hypocaust at Verulamium, St Albans' medieval Clock Tower, and the ruins of Sopwell Priory.

St Albans Museum + Gallery
St Albans Museum + Gallery presents the history and art of St Albans. There are various galleries to explore and the exhibitions change often. It has hosted national touring exhibitions as well as locally curated exhibitions. The museum sometimes includes art exhibitions that are curated by the University of Hertfordshire with which the museums have a partnership.

The museum was founded as the Hertfordshire County Museum in 1898. Its Hatfield Road venue was closed to the public in September 2015 as part of project to regenerate the Old Town Hall as a Museum and Gallery hosting changing exhibits and exhibitions. 
The museums exhibits were only a fraction of the total museums collections in storage. New and never seen before exhibits are making an appearance. The new award-winning Museum+ Gallery opened in 2018 in the Grade II* listed old Town Hall in the city centre.

Verulamium Museum
Verulamium Museum is situated in what was once the forum of the walled city of Verulamium, next to Verulamium Park.
The museum contains information about the Roman and Iron Age periods of St Albans' history. The later history of the settlement is presented at the St Albans Museum + Gallery.

The Verulamium Museum was established following the excavations carried out by Mortimer Wheeler and his wife, Tessa Wheeler, both of them renowned archaeologists, during the 1930s. It was extended in 1996–97. During the building work, an excavation of the site took place.

Gallery

See also
Clock Tower, St Albans
St Albans Town Hall
Kingsbury Watermill Museum
Sopwell Priory
Verulamium Forum inscription
List of museums in Hertfordshire

References

External links
Official website

1898 establishments in England
Archaeological museums in England
Art museums and galleries in Hertfordshire
City museums in the United Kingdom
History museums in Hertfordshire
History of St Albans
Local museums in Hertfordshire
Museums established in 1898
Museums in St Albans
Museums of ancient Rome in the United Kingdom
Roman St Albans
University of Hertfordshire